The Peninsula Daily News is a daily newspaper printed Sundays through Fridays (for publication days of Monday through Saturday), covering the northern Olympic Peninsula in the state of Washington, United States.

The paper's main offices are in Port Angeles, with news offices in Port Townsend and Sequim. It publishes separate editions for Clallam County and Jefferson County. 

In 1963, the Evening News made several innovations to expand of its service to nearby Forks and Sequim, with a dedicated correspondent in each city. Advertising revenue and circulation numbers increased, with the total circulation growing from 6,650 to 7,000.

In the 2000s the Daily News also produced Sequim This Week.

Sound Publications of Poulsbo, Washington, the largest publisher of community newspapers in Washington and a division of Canadian publisher Black Press, purchased the Peninsula Daily News for an undisclosed sum in November 2011. The paper's previous owner, Horvitz Newspapers of Bellevue, Washington, had held it for 17 years.

The same day it purchased the Peninsula Daily News, Sound Publications also bought a competing weekly newspaper publisher, Olympic View Publishing Company, owner of the Sequim Gazette and Forks Forum, along with local real estate publications.

Both the Daily News and the former Olympic View publications are printed at Sound Publications' "state-of-the-art" presses in Everett. The closure of the Daily News presses in Port Angeles in November 2011 cost 20 full- and part-time pressroom and mailroom jobs.

References

External links
 Peninsula Daily News

Newspapers published in Washington (state)
Clallam County, Washington
Jefferson County, Washington
Publications established in 1916